Santa Barbara or Santa Bárbara may refer to:

 Saint Barbara, an early Christian saint and martyr
 Santa Barbara, California, a city in the United States.

Places

Argentina
Santa Bárbara Department, Jujuy, Jujuy Province
Santa Bárbara, Salta

Australia
Santa Barbara, Queensland, a town in the City of Gold Coast
Santa Barbara, New Farm, a heritage-listed villa in the City of Brisbane, Queensland

Brazil
Santa Bárbara, Bahia
Santa Bárbara, Minas Gerais
Santa Bárbara d'Oeste, São Paulo 
Santa Bárbara do Leste, Minas Gerais
Santa Bárbara do Monte Verde, Minas Gerais
Santa Bárbara do Tugúrio, Minas Gerais

Cape Verde
Santa Bárbara, Cape Verde

Chile
Santa Bárbara, Chile

Colombia
Santa Bárbara, Antioquia
Santa Bárbara, Nariño
Santa Bárbara de Pinto, Magdalena
Santa Bárbara, Santander

Costa Rica
Santa Bárbara (canton)
Santa Bárbara de Heredia

Cuba
La Demajagua, Isle of Youth, founded as Santa Bárbara

Curaçao
Santa Barbara, Curaçao
Santa Barbara Beach, Curaçao

Dominican Republic
Santa Bárbara de Samaná, Samaná (town)

Guatemala
Santa Bárbara, Huehuetenango
Santa Bárbara, Suchitepéquez

Honduras
Santa Bárbara Department, Honduras
Santa Bárbara, Honduras

Italy
Santa Barbara (Ceraso), Province of Salerno, Campania
Santa Barbara, a subdivision of Muggia, Province of Trieste

Mexico
Santa Bárbara, Chihuahua
Santa Bárbara Municipality
Santa Bárbara, Durango
Ocampo, Tamaulipas, founded as Santa Bárbara

Philippines
Santa Barbara, Iloilo
Santa Barbara, Pangasinan

Portugal
Santa Bárbara (Angra do Heroísmo), Terceira, Azores
Santa Bárbara (Ponta Delgada), São Miguel Island, Azores
Santa Bárbara (Ribeira Grande), São Miguel Island, Azores
Santa Bárbara (Vila do Porto), Santa Maria Island, Azores
Manadas, once known as Santa Bárbara, Velas, São Jorge Island, Azores

Spain
Santa Bàrbara, Tarragona, Montsià, Catalonia
Santa Bárbara Castle, Alicante
Playa de Santa Bárbara, a beach in La Línea de la Concepción

United States
Santa Barbara, California
Santa Barbara County, California
Mission Santa Barbara
Presidio of Santa Barbara
University of California, Santa Barbara
Santa Barbara Island, California
Santa Barbara Channel
Santa Barbara National Forest, the former name of California's Los Padres National Forest
Santa Barbara, New Mexico
Santa Barbara station (PAAC) (closed), Bethel Park, Pennsylvania

Venezuela
Santa Bárbara del Zulia
Santa Bárbara, Ezequiel Zamora Municipality, Barinas

Arts and entertainment
Santa Barbara (TV series), a 1980s American soap opera
Santa Bárbara (TV series), a 2015 Portuguese telenovela 
Santa Barbara (film), a 2014 South Korean film
"Santa Bárbara bendita", a traditional song of the Asturian coal miners
 "Santa Barbara", a 1978 song by Ronnie Milsap, b-side of "Back on My Mind Again"
 Santa Barbara, a fictional nation, a setting of the novel Sard Harker

Other uses
Santa Barbara Airlines, a Venezuelan airline
Santa Bárbara Sistemas, a Spanish defense contractor

See also
St. Barbara's Church (disambiguation)